Mohammad Ruhul Amin (1935–1971), was an engine room artificer in the Bangladesh Navy who was posthumously awarded the Bangladesh's highest bravery award, Bir Sreshtho, for his service and bravery during the Liberation War.

He was killed on 10 December 1971 while on board BNS Palash, which was sunk in reportedly an accidental fire by Indian Air Force (IAF).

Early life
Bir Shrestho Ruhul Amin was born in 1935 at Bagpanchra village under what is now Sonaimuri Upazila of Noakhali district. His father was Mohammad Azhar Patwari and mother was Zulekha Khatun.

Involvement in the Liberation War

At the start of Bangladesh Liberation War with Operation Searchlight, Amin immediately resigned from the Pakistan Navy, left PNS Comilla at Chittagong, and returned to his village. He organized local youths and soldiers for the war. In May, he along with 500 others joined at Sector-3 under Major K M Shafiullah. Later he enrolled at Palash, a warship of Bangladesh Navy and at the same time worked as the squadron leader for both warships Padma and Palash.

On 10 December 1971, during the concluding days of the Bangladesh Liberation War, an incident occurred at the Rupsha river in Khulna. In a successful campaign of the allied Bangladesh and Indian naval forces, after freeing Jessore, the ships were advancing towards capturing the Titumir naval base from the Pakistan Navy. Two of the warships of the Bangladesh Navy/Mukti Bahini named Padma and Palash mistakenly came under fire from the Indian Air Force as it crossed the river Rupsha near the Khulna shipyard. According to some other witnesses, Indian Air Force fired at different places of Khunla city earlier that day and incidentally one of those bombs had fallen at the warship Palash. Ruhul Amin was working as an artificer of that ship. Both ships caught fire. As a result of heavy bombing, the engine room in the warship caught fire and in a bid to save the ship, Ruhul Amin tried to extinguish it, ignoring orders to abandon the ship. But the engine room was under fire again and another shell exploded which injured Ruhul Amin and made him to abandon the ship. He jumped into the water and swam ashore but was attacked and killed with bayonets by the awaiting Razakars.

Legacy
Ro Ro Ferry Bir Shreshtha Ruhul Amin was named after him. The Bangladesh Navy warship BNS Shaheed Ruhul Amin is named after him. Bir Shrestha Ruhul Amin Sarani is a road in Saidpur cantonment, Saidpur, Nilphamari which is named after him. Bir Shrestha Shahid Ruhul Amin Stadium in Chittagong is named after him.

He had three daughters and two sons. His youngest son lives in poverty and struggles to make a living.

References

1934 births
1971 deaths
Bangladesh Navy personnel
People killed in the Bangladesh Liberation War
Pakistani defectors
Recipients of the Bir Sreshtho
Mukti Bahini personnel
People from Sonaimuri Upazila